was the 14th and final daimyō of Tokushima Domain, Awa Province, and the 2nd President of the House of Peers in Meiji period Japan.

Early life 
Hachisuka was born at the Hachisuka domain residence in Edo, as the eldest son of the 13th daimyō Hachisuka Narihiro (1821–1868). Hachisuka Narihiro was the 22nd child of shōgun Tokugawa Ienari, and was adopted into the Hachisuka clan as the 12th daimyō, Hachisuka Narimasa was childless. Thus, Mochiaki was the grandson of Tokugawa Ienari, nephew of Tokugawa Ieyoshi and cousin of Tokugawa Iesada and Iemochi.
However, when his father suddenly died in 1868 and he became heir, Japan was already in the midst of the Boshin War leading to the Meiji Restoration. Quick to see the direction in which the wind was blowing, he pledged loyalty to the Imperial forces, and led his troops against Tokugawa partisans in Mutsu Province. His forces were armed with western rifles and accompanied by British military advisors, giving him a much greater strength than their small numbers might have indicated.

Political career 
In 1869, with the hanseki hokan (Abolition of the han system), he was appointed Governor of Tokushima Prefecture.

In 1872, Hachisuka went to Great Britain and attended Oxford University, where he matriculated at Balliol College in 1874. After returning to Japan, he joined the government as Director of the Customs Bureau director in the Ministry of Finance and a member of Sanjiin (legislative advisory council).

In 1882, Hachisuka was envoy extraordinary and minister plenipotentiary to France, and received the title of kōshaku (marquis) under the new kazoku peerage system. After returning to Japan, he served as a member of the House of Peers, Governor of Tokyo Prefecture, President of the House of Peers, Minister of Education, and Privy Councillor.

He died in 1918, and his grave is located in Tokushima.

Honours
Translated from the corresponding article in the Japanese Wikipedia
Marquess (7 July 1884)
Grand Cordon of the Order of the Sacred Treasure (14 March 1896)
Grand Cordon of the Order of the Rising Sun (26 December 1903) (Second Class: 25 November 1887; Third Class: 16 July 1881)
Grand Cordon of the Order of the Rising Sun with Paulownia Flowers (10 February 1918; posthumous)

Order of precedence
Fourth rank (April 1860)
Second rank (21 April 1868)
Senior second rank (20 December 1895)
First rank (10 February 1918; posthumous)

Personal life 
Hachisuka Mochiaki ran an experimental farm in Hokkaidō, as he often stated that the nobility needed to have some gainful employment other than government service. He also enjoyed haiku poetry and noh drama and actively promoted these traditional arts.

Family
 Father: Hachisuka Narihiro
 Mother: Takatsukasa Shinako (1820–1858)
 Wives:
 Ayahime
 Yoriko (1854–1923)
 Concubine: unknown
 Child: Hachisuka Masaaki (1871–1932)

Ancestry

Reference and further reading 

 Beasley, W. G. The Meiji Restoration. Stanford: Stanford University Press, 1972.
 Cobbing, Andrew. The Japanese Discovery of Victorian Britain. RoutledgeCurzon, London, 1998. 
 Fraser, Andrew. Japan's Early Parliaments, 1890–1905. Routledge(1995). 
 Koyama Noboru. Japanese Students at Cambridge University in the Meiji Era, 1868–1912: Pioneers for the Modernization of Japan. Lulu.com (2004).

External links 
 – Biography and Photo in National Diet Library

|-

|-

|-

|-

1846 births
1918 deaths
Hachisuka clan
Japanese diplomats
Japanese expatriates in the United Kingdom
Members of the House of Peers (Japan)
Kazoku
People from Tokushima Prefecture
Tozama daimyo
Education ministers of Japan
Governors of Tokyo